The 1930 Furman Purple Hurricane football team represented Furman University as an independent during the 1930 college football season. Led by third-year head coach T. B. Amis, the Purple Hurricane compiled a record of 6–3–1.

Schedule

References

Furman
Furman Paladins football seasons
Furman Purple Hurricane football